El mundo frio is the fourth full-length studio album by Japanese doom metal band Corrupted.  The album consists of a single, continuous 71-minute song. The instrumentation is notable for inclusion of the Western harp.

The title is Spanish for "The Cold World", albeit with the accent over frío left off.

Musical style
After the brief detour of the previous album Se hace por los suenos asesinos, the guitars in the album's final third ceased to be as doomy and distorted as they’d been, and almost shifted into post-rock, as vocalist Hevi began to recite the lyrics in a hoarse, earnest whisper rather than his usual bestial roar.

Track listing

Personnel
Talbot – acoustic guitar, electric guitar
Yokota – bass guitar, electric guitar
Chew Hasegawa – drums
Hevi – vocals
Anri – harp
Masahiko Ono – artwork
Ippei Suda – engineering

References

Corrupted (band) albums
2005 albums